Robert Auld may refer to: 

 Bertie Auld (born 1938), Scottish football player
 Robert Auld (British Army officer) (1848–1911), lieutenant-governor of Guernsey from 1908 to 1911